Steel City Roller Derby or SCRD, is a women's flat-track roller derby league based in Pittsburgh, Pennsylvania. Founded in 2006, the league celebrated its tenth anniversary in 2016. Steel City is a member of the Women's Flat Track Derby Association (WFTDA).

History and league structure
Steel City was founded as the "Steel City Derby Demons" in 2006, after Natalie "Busty Brawler" Gilchrist, Pam "Suzy Sydal" Simmons, and Becky "Elsa Slam" Bauer were inspired to recruit skaters for a potential roller derby team after hearing from a friend about the L.A. Derby Dolls. By early 2007, Steel City was ready to hold its first public games at BladeRunners in Harmarville, and was announced as a new member of the Women's Flat Track Derby Association (WFTDA) in May 2007.

Upon its founding, Steel City had four teams, the Bitch Doctors, the Hot Metal Hellions, the Slumber Party Slashers and the Wrecking Dolls. As of 2016, SCRD features two travel teams, including the WFTDA all-star A-team, Steel Hurtin', and the B-team (formerly known as the "Blitzburgh Bombers"), Steel Beamers. Steel City also has a three team home league comprising the Allegheny Avengers, the Mon Monsters, and the Penn Bruisers.

Then-league member Jennifer "Snot Rocket Science" Gaskins was a member of Team USA at the 2011 and 2014 editions of the Roller Derby World Cup.

In 2011, Pittsburgh city councillor Natalia Rudiak sponsored a proclamation at Pittsburgh City Council that led to a declaration of September 13, 2011 as "Steel City Derby Demons Day" in recognition of the league's "community involvement, commitment to athleticism, and positive international representation of Pittsburgh".

For much of its history, Steel City played its home games, and practiced at Romp N Roll, a roller rink in Glenshaw, which was announced to be closing in late 2016. As of 2017, Steel City is holding its home events at the Pittsburgh Indoor Sports Arena in Cheswick.

WFTDA competition
After gaining WFTDA membership in 2007, Steel City first qualified for WFTDA Playoffs in 2009, as the seventh seed at that year's Eastern Regional Tournament. After opening the weekend with a sound defeat against Philly, Steel City bounced back with victories over the Dominion Derby Girls and DC Rollergirls to finish the weekend in seventh place. In 2010, Steel City improved their Eastern Regional performance by taking the fifth-place game 151-121 over the Carolina Rollergirls, and improved yet again in 2011, losing the third-place game 189-94 to Charm City to finish in fourth place. At the final East Region Playoff in 2012, fifth-seeded Steel City lost their first games to Charm City and DC, but rebounded to set a then-new Playoffs record by defeating the Dutchland Rollers 476-107 to take ninth place.

In 2013, the WFTDA moved to a top-40 Division system for Playoffs, and Steel City qualified at the Division 1 level for the tournament in Asheville, North Carolina, where they entered as the fifth seed and finished in fifth place with a 202-185 victory over Houston Roller Derby. At the 2014 Division 1 Playoff in Evansville, Indiana, seven-seed Steel City finished in eighth place with a 184-170 loss to Toronto Roller Derby. Steel City took seventh place at the 2015 Division 1 Playoff in Jacksonville with a 281-134 win over Charlottesville Derby Dames, and as the tenth seed in 2016 in Columbia, South Carolina, Steel City defeated Ann Arbor Derby Dimes 258-105 to finish in ninth place.

Rankings

References

External links
SCRD Official Website

Roller derby leagues in Pennsylvania
Women's sports in the United States
Sports in Pittsburgh
Roller derby leagues established in 2006
2006 establishments in Pennsylvania
Women's sports in Pennsylvania